Anjireh-ye Gowkhast (also Romanized as Ānjīreh-ye Gowkhāst) is a village in Khvajehei Rural District, Meymand District, Firuzabad County, Fars Province, Iran. At the 2006 census, its population was 31, in 6 families.

References 

Populated places in Firuzabad County